Christina Marie Moses (born January 24, 1978) is an American actress. She is known for portraying Jana Mayfield on The CW's limited series Containment and Keelin on The CW drama series The Originals. In 2016, she played the leading role of Marie Walker in the movie How We Met. She currently stars as Regina in the Television series A Million Little Things.

Early life
Moses was born and raised in Los Angeles. Later she moved to New York City and lived there for 9 years where she taught black history through art and performed in various community and off-Broadway theatre after graduating from Eugene Lang College of Liberal Arts of The New School. Christina's father was an acting teacher, writer, and director.

Career
Moses took part in an ABC Talent Showcase at the Acorn Theatre in 2008. This led to her securing an agent and she returned to Los Angeles. She booked roles in ABC Family's Twisted and The CW's Nikita. Moses also appeared in the fan project Star Trek: New Voyages. In 2014, Moses was cast as a series regular in the CW limited series Containment, created by showrunner Julie Plec.

Between 2017 and 2018, she played in the recurring cast the last royal werewolf and emergency doctor named Keelin Malraux, during the season 4 and season 5 of show "The Originals", from The CW. With romantic couple LGBT with the character of the actress Riley Voelkel, the powerful witch Freya Mikaelson.

At in 2018, she acted as part of the recurring cast of "Condor".

Since 2018, she is part of the main cast of the television series "A Million Little Things".

Filmography

Film

Television

References

External links
 

Living people
American television actresses
American film actresses
21st-century American actresses
Actresses from Los Angeles
1978 births